"Colorado" is a song by German folk rock band Milky Chance. It was released on 18 June 2021 as a single from the band's debut compilation album Trip Tape. The band's members Clemens Rehbein and Philipp Maximilian Dausch wrote the song with Joacim Bo Persson and Sebastian Arman, and produced it with Decco.

Content
The band's vocalist and guitarist Clemens Rehbein told American Songwriter: "It's about consuming and compensating and being destructive or being weak for a moment, We all need it sometimes, but we also know it probably doesn’t bring us anywhere in the long run. This is what the song is about not to forget—with a little wink in the end. It's very honest but also not taking itself too seriously at the same time. We feel like that's a very realistic and maybe healthy way to look at this life we're all in". Wonderland magazine described "Colorado" as "a vibrant, up-tempo tune about the uneasiness of failed relationships, and horse tranquiliser".

Music video
The music video was released on 18 June 2021, and directed by Vincent Sylvain. It was filmed at "a visibly striking but faded hotel", with scenes set in the late 1970s. The band members play both employees and guests "engaged in strange, questionable, and hallucinatory practices". They end up in room 420, where they are "surrounded by swan-shaped towels, the[n] strum, sing, and fall into a trance".

Credits and personnel
Credits adapted from Tidal.

 Decco– producer
 Milky Chance – producer
 Clemens Rehbein – composer
 Joacim Bo Persson – composer
 Philipp Maximilian Dausch – composer
 Sebastian Arman – composer

Charts

Weekly charts

Year-end charts

Certifications

Release history

References

2021 singles
2021 songs
Milky Chance songs